Katarina Bulatović (born 15 November 1984) is a retired
Montenegrin handball player that played the right back position.

Career
Internationally she represented Serbia and Montenegro and Serbia, before opting to play for Montenegro in 2011.

She was third best goalscorer of the EHF Women's Champions League in the three editions, 2010–11, 2011–12, 2013–14.

She competed at the 2012 Summer Olympics, where the Montenegrin team won the silver medal, and Bulatović was top scorer with 53 goals and also voted into the All-star team.

She has also competed at the 2012 European Women's Handball Championship, where the Montenegrin team won the gold medal, and Bulatović was top scorer with 56 goals and also voted into the All-star team.

Bulatović was selected for the shortlist of the 2012 IHF World Player of the Year award, and eventually came fourth by collecting 12 percent of the total votes.

After two years abroad, Bulatović is set to move back to Montenegro in summer 2014.

Achievements
Damehåndboldligaen:
Winner: 2007
Montenegrin Championship:
Winner: 2008, 2009, 2010, 2011, 2012, 2015, 2016, 2017, 2019
Montenegrin Cup:
Winner: 2008, 2009, 2010, 2011, 2012, 2015, 2016, 2017, 2019
Liga Naţională:
Winner: 2013
EHF Champions League:
Winner: 2007, 2012, 2014, 2015
Semifinalist: 2011, 2013, 2016,2017,2018
EHF Cup Winners' Cup:
Winner: 2010
European Championship:
Winner: 2012
Olympic Games:
Silver Medalist: 2012

Individual awards
 Olympic Games Top Scorer: 2012
 European Handball Championship Top Scorer: 2012
 All-Star Right Back of the Olympic Games: 2012
 All-Star Right Back of the European Championship: 2012
 Montenegrin Sportsperson of the Year: 2012, 2014
 All-Star Team of the EHF Champions League: 2014
 Team of the Tournament Right Back of the Bucharest Trophy: 2014

References

External links

Living people
1984 births
Serbian female handball players
Montenegrin female handball players
Expatriate handball players
Montenegrin expatriate sportspeople in Denmark
Montenegrin expatriate sportspeople in Hungary
Montenegrin expatriate sportspeople in Romania
Montenegrin expatriate sportspeople in Russia
Handball players at the 2012 Summer Olympics
Handball players at the 2016 Summer Olympics
Olympic handball players of Montenegro
Olympic medalists in handball
Olympic silver medalists for Montenegro
Montenegrin people of Serbian descent
SCM Râmnicu Vâlcea (handball) players
Győri Audi ETO KC players
Sportspeople from Kragujevac
Medalists at the 2012 Summer Olympics
Mediterranean Games silver medalists for Serbia
Competitors at the 2005 Mediterranean Games
Mediterranean Games medalists in handball